Yanov Stan is a rural locality (a settlement) in Turukhansky District of Krasnoyarsk Krai, Russia, located in the upper flows of the Turukhan River,  from Turukhansk, the administrative center of the district, and  from the border with Krasnoselkupsky District in Yamalo-Nenets Autonomous Okrug. It had a population of 20 as of 2010.

Yanov Stan is home to an abandoned railway station on the unused branch of the Salekhard–Igarka Railway.

The climate is bone chilling subarctic (Köppen climate classification Dfc).

References 

 Туруханский район. Межселенная территория

Rural localities in Turukhansky District